Lebanon Reservoir is a man-made lake is located north of  Campbell, New York. Fish species present in the lake include pumpkinseed sunfish, and rainbow trout. There is access by state owned launch off Reservoir Road, 4 miles west of the Village of Hamilton, New York.

References

Lakes of New York (state)
Lakes of Madison County, New York